Associação Atlética Nova Venécia, commonly known as Nova Venécia, is a Brazilian football club based in Nova Venécia, Espírito Santo state.

History
The club was founded on March 25, 1983. Nova Venécia won the Campeonato Capixaba Second Level in 1992. The club merged with Leão de São Marcos Esporte Clube and Veneciano Futebol Clube on June 14, 2001 to former Sociedade Esportiva Veneciano.

Achievements

 Campeonato Capixaba Second Level:
 Winners (1): 1992

Stadium
Associação Atlética Nova Venécia play their home games at Estádio Zenor Pedrosa Rocha. The stadium has a maximum capacity of 2,000 people.

References

Association football clubs established in 1983
Association football clubs disestablished in 2001
Defunct football clubs in Espírito Santo
1983 establishments in Brazil
2001 disestablishments in Brazil